The Bristol Downs Association Football League is an English football league based in the city of Bristol. It is a completely standalone league system which does not feed into the English football league pyramid. The Downs League is unusual in that all matches are played on one site, namely the large open space known as Bristol Downs. The league is affiliated to the Gloucestershire County FA.

History
Organised football first began to be played in Bristol in the 1880s and football started on the Downs around the same time, helped by the introduction of a tram route from the city centre to the top of Blackboy Hill. The Downs League was formed in 1905 with 30 founder members, all of them teams who were already playing in the city and on the Downs' many pitches. One of the founder member clubs, Sneyd Park, remains in the league to this day, having played in the top division of the league in every season since its foundation. Clifton St Vincents joined the league in its second season and have also clocked up 100 years of membership.

In the 1920s the league's top side was Union Jack FC, who won the league nine times in ten seasons and even managed to beat the much higher-ranked Cheltenham Town 6–3 away in the FA Cup in 1925. Future Arsenal star Eddie Hapgood turned out for Union Jack before going on to Football League and international stardom. Another player with Union Jack was Wally Hammond, a future England cricket captain.

In the 1930s Dockland Settlement won six championships in seven seasons. The years after the Second World War was probably when the league was at its strongest, with many players leaving the league to turn professional.

In the 1950s Clifton St. Vincents won six league titles, but St. Gabriels equalled Union Jack's record of seven successive titles between 1969 and 1975.
In recent years Clifton St. Vincents, Torpedo and Sneyd Park have been the dominant sides in the league.

Today the league boasts around 40 teams in four divisions. There are also two knockout cup competitions – the Norman Hardy Cup (for teams from Divisions One and Two) and the All Saints Cup (for teams from Divisions Three and Four). BBC Bristol maintains a keen interest in the league, with news and features.

Past champions
All information from the Full Time website.

Member clubs 2022–23 season

Division One
AFC Bohemia
Ashley
Clifton St. Vincents 
Jersey Rangers
Portland Old Boys
Retainers
Saints Old Boys 
Sneyd Park 
Sporting Greyhounds 
Torpedo

Division Two
Bengal Tigers
Clifton St. Vincents Reserves 
Durdham Down AS
Evergreen Athletic
Old Cliftonians
Saints Old Boys Reserves 
Sneyd Park Reserves
Sporting Turin 
Torpedo Reserves

Division Three
Clifton St. Vincents 'A' 
Cotham Old Boys
Helios
NCSF United
Phoenix Downs
Portland Old Boys Reserves
Saints Old Boys 'A'
Sneyd Park 'A' 
Sporting Greyhounds Reserves 
Torpedo 'A'

Division Four
Clifton St. Vincents 'B' 
Clifton Vale
Jersey Rangers Reserves
Portland Old Boys 'A'
Racing Mouse
Retainers Reserves
Saints Old Boys 'B'
Sneyd Park 'B' 
Sporting Turin 
Torpedo 'B'

References

External links
The Downs League at TheFA.com

Football in Bristol
1905 establishments in England
The Downs, Bristol
Football leagues in England
Sports leagues established in 1905